Frank Williams (26 October 1884 – 15 April 1939) was an  Australian rules footballer who played with St Kilda in the Victorian Football League (VFL).

Notes

External links 

1884 births
1939 deaths
Australian rules footballers from Western Australia
St Kilda Football Club players
West Perth Football Club players